Lucy Hicks Anderson (1886–1954) was an American socialite and chef, best known for her time in Oxnard, California, from 1920 to 1946. Assigned male at birth, she was adamant from an early age that she was a girl. Her parents, based on advice from doctors, supported her decision to live as one. She later established a boarding house in Oxnard, where she became a popular hostess. In 1945, a year after she married her second husband, she was arrested, tried and convicted of perjury, as the government said she had lied about her sex on her marriage license. After her release from prison, she and her husband moved to Los Angeles.

Early life 

Lucy Lawson was born in Waddy, Kentucky, in 1886. From a very early age, Anderson was adamant that she was not male, identifying as female in a time period before the term transgender existed, and naming herself Lucy. Doctors told Anderson's parents to let her live as a young woman, so they did, and she began wearing dresses to school and being known as Lucy.

Marriages and time in Oxnard 

At the age of 15, Anderson left school and did domestic work as a means to support herself. At age 20, she headed west to Pecos, Texas, where she worked in a hotel, and then to New Mexico, where she married her first husband, Clarence Hicks, in Silver City, New Mexico, in 1920. She later moved to Oxnard, California, at the age of 34. A skilled chef, she won some baking contests. Her marriage to Clarence lasted only nine years, but during the course of the union, she saved up enough money to buy property that was a boarding house front for a brothel; it also sold illegal liquor in during the prohibition era. Outside of her time as a madam, she was a well-known socialite and hostess in Oxnard, and would later use her connections to avoid serious jail time. According to scholar C. Riley Snorton, "When the sheriff arrested her one night, her double-barreled reputation paid off—Charles Donlon, the town's leading banker, promptly bailed her out [because] he had scheduled a huge dinner party which would have collapsed dismally with Lucy in jail." In 1944, Hicks married Reuben Anderson, a soldier stationed in Long Island, New York.

Trials 

In 1945, a sailor claimed that he caught a venereal disease from one of the women in Anderson's brothel, so all of the women, including Anderson, were required to undergo medical examination. When the Ventura County district attorney learned from this examination that Anderson had been assigned male at birth, he chose to try her for perjury, arguing that she lied about her sex on her marriage license and impersonated a woman. During the trial, she stated "I defy any doctor in the world to prove that I am not a woman," and "I have lived, dressed, acted just what I am, a woman." However, the court convicted her of perjury on her marriage license and sentenced her to 10 years of probation. At the time, marriage was only valid between a man and a woman, and she was not deemed a woman, so the marriage was declared invalid. As a result, the federal government charged her with fraud for receiving the financial allotments wives of soldiers got under the GI Bill, and initially also with failing to register for the draft, until she proved she had been too old to register. In this trial, she and Reuben were found guilty and sentenced to a men's prison, where Anderson was forbidden by court order to wear women's clothes.

Death and legacy 

After being released from prison, Anderson was barred from returning to Oxnard by the police chief, who threatened further prosecution. She and Reuben relocated to Los Angeles, where they resided quietly until her death in 1954, at 68.

The Handbook of LGBT Elders calls Anderson "one of the earliest documented cases of an African-American transgender person".

One episode of the HBO TV series Equal is based on the life of Anderson.

See also 
 African-American LGBT community
 Transgender rights in the United States
 History of transgender people in the United States

Further reading 

 C. Riley Snorton, Black on Both Sides: A Racial History of Trans Identity (2017), chapter on Anderson

References

External links 
 Lucy Hicks Anderson on BlackPast

1954 deaths
1886 births
American socialites
Chefs from Kentucky
Discrimination against transgender people
LGBT African Americans
LGBT people from Kentucky
People charged with perjury
People from Shelby County, Kentucky
Transgender women